The National Institute of Traumatology & Orthopaedic Rehabilitation (NITOR) is an orthopedic hospital and undergraduate & post-graduate institute in Sher-e-Bangla Nagar, Dhaka, Bangladesh. It was established in 1972 by the Government of Bangladesh as the Shaheed Suhrawardy Hospital. In October 2002 the name of the institute was changed to National Institute of Traumatology & Orthopaedic Rehabilitation (NITOR). NITOR is affiliated previously  to      Dhaka University and now to Bangabandhu Sheikh Mujib Medical University.

Master of Surgery (MS) (Orthopedics) and D. Ortho. awarded by NITOR, a post-graduate institute, are recognized by the Bangladesh Medical and Dental Council.

Departments
 Orthopedics & Traumatology
 Physiotherapy
 Physical Medicine
 Plastic Surgery
 Anesthesiology
 Transfusion Medicine
 Pathology
 Radiology & Imaging
 Department of Endocrinology
 Cardiology
 Social Welfare

References

External links

Universities and colleges in Dhaka
Hospitals in Dhaka
Orthopedic organizations
Traumatology
Educational institutions established in 1972
1972 establishments in Bangladesh
Medical research institutes in Bangladesh